Vitória S.C., commonly known as Vitória de Guimarães, is a Portuguese professional basketball club from the city of Guimarães, Portugal. The basketball team is a part of Vitória S.C., the parent football club.

Trophies
Taça de Portugal: 2
2007–08, 2012–13
Troféu António Pratas: 1
2010
Proliga: 1
2006–07

Players

Current roster

Notable players

 José Vilhena 
 Miguel Cardoso
 Ivan Almeida 
 Joel Almeida

Season by season

References

External links
Official website
Eurobasket.com – Team profile

Basketball teams in Portugal
Vitória S.C.